The Tasmanian Government Railways P Class locomotive was a 2-6-2T engine bought second hand from a timber company in New South Wales. It was withdrawn c1941 having spent the majority of its service in or around Launceston Works and Yards.

Industrial Service
The locomotive was built in 1919 at the Clyde Engineering works in Sydney for Allen Taylor & Company that operated a 1067 mm bush tramway on the Mid North Coast from Myall Lakes through Wootton and over the Pacific Highway to timber leases at Coolongoolook. The locomotive was named Wootton and commenced work in January 1920. It proved too heavy for the line and within a year it was put up for sale.

The Tasmanian Government Railways (TGR) was short of rolling stock and locomotives at the time so the sale of a virtually new locomotive caught their attention and the locomotive was purchased in late 1920 or early 1921.

Tasmanian Government Railways
After some alterations and numbering P1, the locomotive entered service on 14 April 1921 wearing a black lined livery. It had been hoped to use it on the Ulverstone to Nietta line but was deemed unsuitable, It was then employed on the extension of the line from Myalla to Wiltshire where it failed to impress and the TGR attempted to sell the locomotive later that year.

After that, P1 worked around Launceston roundhouse (engine shed) and workshops as a shunting locomotive accruing low mileage. It was overhauled in 1927 and 1932 and unproven word of mouth reminiscences suggested it may have worked the Melrose branch on limestone trains.

It is unclear when the locomotive was withdrawn as it is not mentioned in any official paperwork until 31 January 1945 when it was proposed for writing off. It was dumped at Launceston until February 1951 when it was moved to Mowbray and sold for scrap in October 1951. The actual date of cutting up in unknown.

References

Clyde Engineering locomotives
Railway locomotives introduced in 1919
Steam locomotives of Tasmania
3 ft 6 in gauge locomotives of Australia
2-6-2T locomotives